Old Tom is an Australian-French animated television series based on a series of books by Leigh Hobbs. The series was produced by Yoram Gross The series screened from 2001 to 2002 in Australia and France and was shown in the United Kingdom and United States in 2002.

The series follows the adventures of Angela Throgmorton and her cat named Old Tom, who she treats as if he were her son. Both are oddball and eccentric and together they create mischief. It features the voice talents of Keith Scott as Old Tom.

In Australia, it continues re-runs on the children's network, ABC3.

Characters
 Old Tom - The cat with one eye always up to fun.
 Angela Throgmorton - Old Tom's owner
 Lavinia Winterberry - A rich and Posh friend of Angela.
 Lucy - Old Tom's best friend.
 Billy - A troublesome boy who likes to bother Old Tom.

Episodes

Season 1
 Lost & Found
 Shopping Spree
 Friend and Foe
 Blast Off!
 Fiddle-De-Dee!
 Skin Deep
 Wheel Nuts
 Mad About the House
 Tee For Tom
 Food Feud
 Tidy Your Room!
 Rubble Trouble
 Up, Up, and Away!
 Surprise!
 All At Sea
 www.Old.Tom
 Picture Perfect
 Easy Monet
 Leonardo Da Tom
 Picnic Panic
 Happy Camper
 Too Many Crooks
 Big Top Tom
 Rock'N'Roll Tom
 Green Thumb Fun
 Eau De Tom

Season 2
 Fangs A Lot
 Sorcerer's Apprentice
 Ghost Train
 Plumber's Mate
 Flower Power
 Two To Tango
 Sailing Away
 Bird in the Hand
 The Queen and I
 Faster Pasta
 Piece Of Cake
 Good Sports
 Lets Get Quizzical
 In a Whirl
 April Fool!
 Rainy Daze
 Whale of a Time
 Switched-On Tom
 Seeing Spots
 Zoo-Loose
 Aieee! Robot
 Swings and Roundabouts
 Tree's a Crowd
 Tutenkhamen Tom
 Lights! Camera! Old Tom!
 Meteor Madness

See also
 The Adventures of Blinky Bill (1993–2004)
 Samuel and Nina (1996–1997)
 Tabaluga (1997–2004)
 Skippy: Adventures in Bushtown (1998–1999)
 Flipper and Lopaka (1999–2005)

References

External links

Old Tom on tv.com
Old Tom on Yoram Gross Films

Australian Broadcasting Corporation original programming
Seven Network original programming
2002 Australian television series debuts
2002 Australian television series endings
2002 French television series debuts
2002 French television series endings
Australian children's animated television series
Australian television shows based on children's books
French television shows based on children's books
French children's animated television series
Animated television series about cats
Television shows set in Melbourne